What came to be known as the Atlanta Compromise stemmed from a speech given by Booker T. Washington, president of the Tuskegee Institute, to the Cotton States and International Exposition in Atlanta, Georgia, on September 18, 1895. It was first supported and later opposed by W. E. B. Du Bois and other African-American leaders.

In the speech, also known as the Atlanta Exposition Speech, Washington promoted vocational education, industrial occupations, and the learning of other practical trades that would give African Americans opportunities for economic advancement and wealth creation rather than other more intellectual pursuits such as higher education. At least for the present, Washington proposed, Blacks would not focus their demands on equality or integration, and Northern whites should fund black educational charities.

Social impact 

Essential elements of the compromise articulated in Washington's speech were that—at least for the present—blacks would not ask for the right to vote, they would not retaliate against racist behavior, they would tolerate segregation and discrimination, and that they should receive free basic education, particularly vocational or industrial training (for instance as teachers or nurses).

After the turn of the 20th century, other black leaders, most notably W. E. B. Du Bois and William Monroe Trotter a group Du Bois would call "The Talented Tenth"  took issue with the Compromise, instead believing that African-Americans should engage in a struggle for civil rights.  W. E. B. Du Bois coined the term "Atlanta Compromise" to denote Booker's earlier proposal. The term "accommodationism" is also used to denote the essence of the Atlanta compromise.

William Archer noted that race relations in the United States became more hostile in the decade following the Atlanta compromise, possibly because acceptance of blacks in the South required that each "knew his place", which was undermined by Washington's program of seeking education and uplift without first seeking acknowledgment of equality. Archer referred to the Atlanta Massacre of 1906 as "a grimly ironic comment on Mr. Washington's speech." Du Bois believed that the Massacre was a consequence of the Atlanta Compromise.

After Washington's death in 1915, supporters of the Atlanta Compromise gradually shifted their support to civil rights activism, until the Civil Rights Movement commenced in the 1950s.

See also
American Negro Academy
Niagara Movement
NAACP

Footnotes

References

Harlan, Louis R. (1986), Booker T. Washington: The Wizard of Tuskegee, 1901-1915, Oxford University Press, pp. 71–120.
Harlan, Louis R. (2006), "A Black Leader in the Age of Jim Crow", in The Racial Politics of Booker T. Washington, Donald Cunnigen, Rutledge M. Dennis, Myrtle Gonza Glascoe (eds), Emerald Group Publishing, p. 26.

Logan, Rayford Whittingham, The Betrayal of the Negro, from Rutherford B. Hayes to Woodrow Wilson, Da Capo Press, 1997, pp. 275–313.

External links

 Transcript of Booker T. Washington's Atlanta Exposition Address (1895).
Transcript of Booker T. Washington's Atlanta Exposition Address (1895), including a response by W. E. B. Du Bois.
The Rise and Fall of Jim Crow, a PBS documentary regarding Washington in 1895.

African-American history between emancipation and the civil rights movement
Booker T. Washington
History of Atlanta
History of racial segregation in the United States
History of African-American civil rights
1895 in Georgia (U.S. state)